born in 1899 in Shuri Okinawa became an Okinawan martial arts master who, despite dying at the age of 28 in 1927, is notable for aiding in the evolution of Shōrin-ryū karate. He was extremely important in the education of Shōshin Nagamine, who later went on to found Matsubayashi-ryū karate.  He was also the uncle of Ansei Ueshiro, the chief instructor at Shoshin Nagamine's original dojo and creator of Fukyugata Sandan.

Born in November 1899 in the village of Akata, Province of Shuri, Okinawa, he was the eldest of a family of 11 children. His parents were prosperous farmers, so he lived a comfortable childhood. He was quite young when he began his training in Karate with Shinpan Gusukuma, also known under the name of Shinpan Shiroma (1890–1954), who was his teacher at primary school. One of his teachers at his school was Chomo Hanashiro (1869–1945). Later he became a student of Choshin Chibana (1885–1969), founder of KobayashiShorin-ryu (en). Having no other worries concerning his training, having great support from his parents, he quickly reached a very high level, and was nicknamed Uwayaguwa Ankichi.

Ankichi became an Okinawan martial arts master. His tsumasaki-geri (toe strike), which was his specialty, was devastating. Two stories exist in oral tradition about this kick. One was done to a wrestler the other to his brother. When comparing the symptoms caused by the toe-kick as well as the location of the strike, it appears as if it may have caused a traumatic pseudo-aneurysm in both people kicked. This hypothesis would explain the delayed death of the wrestler.

He died at the age of 28 years, due to a stomach ulcer.

References

1899 births
1927 deaths
Okinawan male karateka
Shōrin-ryū practitioners